Cypa is a genus of moths in the family Sphingidae. The genus was erected by Francis Walker in 1865.

Species
Cypa bouyeri Cadiou 1998
Cypa claggi Clark 1935
Cypa decolor (Walker 1856)
Cypa duponti Roepke 1941
Cypa enodis Jordan 1931
Cypa ferruginea Walker 1865
Cypa kitchingi Cadiou 1997
Cypa latericia Inoue 1991
Cypa luzonica Brechlin, 2009
Cypa terranea (Butler 1876)
Cypa uniformis Mell 1922

References

 
Smerinthini
Moth genera
Taxa named by Francis Walker (entomologist)